Dry Creek is a stream located in Washington and St. Francois Counties in the U.S. state of Missouri. It is a tributary of the Big River.

Dry Creek was named for the fact it often runs dry.

See also
List of rivers of Missouri

References

External links
Missouri Department of Natural Resources. Use Attainability Analysis for WBID 2164 Dry Creek.

Rivers of St. Francois County, Missouri
Rivers of Washington County, Missouri
Rivers of Missouri